The Dull Knife Battlefield is located on the eastern slope of the Bighorn Mountains in Johnson County, Wyoming near Kaycee. It was the scene of the Dull Knife Fight on November 25, 1876, in which the Fourth Cavalry under General Ranald S. Mackenzie raided the winter encampment of the NorthernCheyenne, destroying most of their material culture and all their winter supplies and thus forcing the Northern Cheyenne to seek shelter with the village of Crazy Horse in order to survive the winter. Five hundred ponies were captured and about 173 lodges destroyed. The Dull Knife battlefield is on private land and is available to visit only by special arrangement.  The fight took place on November 25, 1876.

The battlefield site was considered by the Cheyenne to be sufficiently remote to be safe as winter quarters.  The location is now the site of a ranch. The site was placed on the National Register of Historic Places in 1979.

References

External links
 at the National Park Service's NRHP database
Dull Knife Battlefield at the Wyoming State Historic Preservation Office

Photo gallery

Geography of Johnson County, Wyoming
Battlefields of the wars between the United States and Native Americans
Conflict sites on the National Register of Historic Places in Wyoming
National Register of Historic Places in Johnson County, Wyoming